The defense industry of Taiwan is a strategically important sector and a significant employer. They primarily supply weapons and platforms to the Republic of China Armed Forces with few major weapons systems exported abroad. With foreign assistance the Taiwanese defense industry has produced fighter aircraft, missile systems, surface ships, radars, rocket artillery, armored vehicles, and small arms.

History

The defense sector was reinvigorated following the recognition of the PRC by the United States in 1979 and the subsequent uncertainty this injected into the US-Taiwan relationship. The KMT government aimed to eventually achieve full self sufficiency in weapons systems.

In 2014 the Aerospace Industrial Development Corporation was privatized with the government retaining a 39% stake and the National Chung-Shan Institute of Science and Technology was made an administrative corporation of the government rather than a constituent of the Armaments Bureau.

Under DPP President Tsai Ing-wen, there was a renewed focus on indigenous manufacturing, particularly of air and naval defense.President Tsai has also increased the military budget.

In 2021 Ministry of National Defense launched an initiative to recruit foreign workers to permanent jobs in Taiwan to address local talent shortages. The initiative also aims to address disruption stemming from the churn of contracted foreign technicians and advisors.

In 2022, 800 combat drones manufactured by DronesVision were transferred to Ukraine through Poland for use during the 2022 Russian invasion of Ukraine.

Taiwanese company JC Tech has created a "Taiwanese Switchblade" suicide drone called the Flyingfish. After a while, NCSIST also demonstrated a loitering munition made indigenously.

Manufacturers
The National Chung-Shan Institute of Science and Technology, the Armaments Bureau, and the Aerospace Industrial Development Corporation are the only three Taiwanese defense manufacturing firms with the capabilities of a full defense prime. In addition to the big defense firms there are more than 200 small and medium businesses involved in the defense industry.

Land Vehicles 

Domestic vehicle industry supplies the ROC Army with armored personnel transport and some light vehicles. Famous examples include CM-12 Tank, CM-21 Armored Vehicle, CM-32 Armoured Vehicle, and many more.

Maritime industry 

The major shipbuilders, CSBC Corporation, Taiwan, Jong Shyn Shipbuilding Company, and Lungteh Shipbuilding, all build military and coast guard vessels.  Military and Coast Guard orders make up a large portion of shipbuilders books by dollar value. Between the Taiwanese Navy and the Coast Guard Administration Taiwan spends approximately a billion dollars a year on new vessel construction.Famous examples include Tuo Chiang-class corvette, Panshih-class fast combat support ship, and Yushan-class landing platform dock. Moreover, Taiwan is working on the Indigenous Defense Submarine to create a fleet of new diesel attack submarines.

Law and regulation
In 2019 the Legislative Yuan passed the National Defense Industry Development Act which among other things instructed the Ministry of National Defense to evaluate prospective defense companies and rank them in three tiers based on their technological capability, the size of their operations and their experience in researching, developing, manufacturing and maintaining military equipment, as well as their track record working with academia, businesses or foreign companies.

Later in 2019 the Legislative Yuan passed a bill which encourages foreign direct investment in the defense industry and other ”strategic” industries. The bill allows foreign investors in these sectors to claim "special tax rates" and also tax rebates of up to half their tax bill.

Exports

The T65 and T91 assault rifles have been widely exported and the upper receiver for the T91 has been sold on the US civilian market. Taiwanese SOEs have not exported any major high-end weapons systems but the Taiwanese Government is becoming more open to the idea. Private companies have been more successful, with Lungteh Shipbuilding supplying multiple generations of the Multipurpose Assault Craft to the Philippines. The Taiwanese government has expressed increasing interest in supplying high end weapons systems and components to like-minded democracies.

Trade shows
The Taipei Aerospace & Defense Technology Exhibition is the primary Taiwanese defense industry trade show, it is held biennially.

See also
 Defense industry of Israel
 Defense industry of Russia
 Defense industry of Japan
 Maritime industries of Taiwan

References

Taiwan
Industry in Taiwan
Science and technology in Taiwan